Iwaya Station is the name of two train stations in Japan:

 Iwaya Station (Hyōgo)
 Iwaya Station (Saga)